Carmignano di Brenta is a comune (municipality) in the Province of Padua in the Italian region Veneto, located about  northwest of Venice and about  northwest of Padua.  

Carmignano di Brenta borders the following municipalities: Cittadella, Fontaniva, Grantorto, Pozzoleone, San Pietro in Gu.

Twin towns
Carmignano di Brenta is twinned with:

  Albbruck, Germany, since 1959

References

External links
 Official website

Cities and towns in Veneto